Kaiparathina coriolis is a species of sea snail, a marine gastropod mollusk in the family Trochidae.

Description
The length of the shell attains 10.1 mm.

Distribution
This marine species occurs off the Northern Lord Howe Rise in the Coral Sea.

References

 Marshall B.A. (1993) A review of the genus Kaiparathina Laws, 1941 (Mollusca: Gastropoda: Trochoidea). The Veliger 36: 185-198

External links
 To World Register of Marine Species

coriolis
Gastropods described in 1993